Verheyen is a Dutch-language toponymic surname. It is a variant spelling of Verheijen and a contraction of the surname Van der Heijden, meaning "from the heath".

Notable people with this surname include:

Carl Verheyen (born 1954), American guitarist, known for his work in Supertramp
David Verheyen (born 1981), Belgian road racing cyclist
 (1877–1955), German racing cyclist
Geert Verheyen (born 1973), Belgian road racing cyclist
Gert Verheyen (born 1970), Belgian footballer
Gustave Verheyen (1880–1951), South African cricket umpire
Jacques Verheyen (1911–1989), Dutch glazier and painter
Jan Verheyen (born 1944), Belgian footballer
Jean Verheyen (1896–?), Belgian cyclist
 (1932–1984), Belgian painter
Philip Verheyen (1648–1711), Belgian surgeon
Piet A. Verheyen (born 1931), Dutch economist
René Verheyen (born 1952), Belgian football midfielder
 (born 1983), Belgian jazz saxophonist and composer
Sabine Verheyen (born 1964), German politician and Member of the European Parliament
 (1932–2005), Belgian zoologist

Dutch-language surnames